TalkRadio (previously styled as talkRADIO) is a talk radio station broadcasting nationally in the United Kingdom, which was relaunched on 21 March 2016. Based in London and owned by Wireless Group, a subsidiary of News Corp., it is the sister station of national stations Talksport (itself originally known as Talk Radio UK), Talksport 2, Virgin Radio UK and Times Radio.

As of December 2022, the station has a weekly audience of 608,000 listeners according to RAJAR.

History
The original Talk Radio started in February 1995 using the AM wavelengths previously occupied by BBC Radio 1 (1053/1089 kHz). It saw a number of presenters host shows in its first two years but settled down to a regular schedule with presenters such as Carol McGiffin, Scott Chisholm, Anna Raeburn, Tommy Boyd and Mike Dickin. It failed to make sufficient revenue and in the late 1990s introduced sports output which increased audiences. In 2000 the station changed its name to Talksport and almost all programming was of a sporting nature other than overnights and the mid-morning show. In March 2012, this 39 hours  of non-sporting content was axed from the station.

The introduction of a new DAB multiplex enabled Talkradio to be relaunched as a separate channel from Talksport on DAB on 21 March 2016.  At launch, the station featured presenters Paul Ross, Julia Hartley-Brewer, Sam Delaney, Jon Holmes, Jonny Gould, and Iain Lee across its weekday schedule. At weekends, the station featured Alexis Conran, Eamonn Holmes, Bob Mills, Martin Roberts, Penny Smith, Jerry Springer, Anna Williamson, and Jake Yapp. The station offers news bulletins every hour. News bulletins from Sky News Radio are carried at weekends.  Overnight programming was originally simulcast from talkSPORT until January 2018.

In January 2018, Talkradio underwent a revamp to the weekday and weekend schedule in a bid to boost ratings and make the station more news-focused.

In June 2020, Talkradio announced that it would be moving from DAB to DAB+. The DAB+ signal began transmitting on 9 June alongside the DAB signal. The DAB signal ceased transmission on 26 June.

On 14 April 2022, talkRADIO's Twitter account was rebranded as TalkTV.

On 19 April 2022, the new radio app was released on Apple, with the station now styled as TalkRadio.

Controversies
Presenter James Whale was suspended over a 30 July 2018 interview with an alleged sex assault victim that was said by the station to have "completely lacked sensitivity". He was suspended for a week and his show returned on 13 August. He apologised to the alleged victim.

Broadcasting regulator Ofcom ruled in 2019 that two episodes of former MP George Galloway's show breached impartiality rules due to the lack of dissenting views to Galloway's own on the subjects of Antisemitism in the UK Labour Party and the Salisbury poisoning. In June 2019, Galloway was sacked by the station for a tweet in which he praised Liverpool F.C. for winning the 2019 UEFA Champions League Final instead of Tottenham Hotspur, a team with strong links to the Jewish community; he wrote "No #Israël [sic] flags on the Cup!" Tottenham Hotspur and Jewish organisations condemned Galloway's comment.

In September 2020, presenter Mark Dolan cut up a disposable mask during a Talkradio broadcast, while claiming that wearing masks did not have a significant impact on COVID-19.

On 5 January 2021, Talkradio's YouTube channel was briefly terminated without explanation. Within a few hours the station returned to the YouTube platform. In a statement YouTube said "TalkRadio's YouTube channel was briefly suspended, but upon further review, has now been reinstated. We quickly remove flagged content that violate our community guidelines, including Covid-19 content that explicitly contradict expert consensus from local health authorities or the World Health Organization. We make exceptions for material posted with an educational, documentary, scientific or artistic purpose, as was deemed in this case."

News
Until the launch of Talk TV, Sky News Radio provided hourly news bulletins for the network via Independent Radio News. Upon the television network launch, that side began to provide those services to the radio network.

Programmes

Current shows

Former shows

Former presenters
 Anna Williamson (2016)
 Jon Holmes (2016–2018)
 Sam Delaney (2016–2018)
 Martin Roberts (2016–2018)
 Jake Yapp (2016–2018)
 Jerry Springer (2016–2018)
 Yasmin Khan (2016–2018)
 George Galloway (2016–2019)
 Eamonn Holmes (2016, 2018–2020)
 Iain Lee (2016–2020)
 Matthew Wright (2018–2020) 
 Alexis Conran (2016–2020)
 Giles Coren (2019–2020)
 Jamie East (2017–2020)
 Dan Wootton (2018–2020)
 Mark Dolan (2019–2021)
 Penny Smith (2016–2021) (Now appears on The Talk & First Edition)
 Mike Parry (2020–2021)
 John Nicolson (2017–2021)
 Paul Ross (2016–2022)
 Bob Mills (2018–2022) 
 Nick de Bois (2020-2022) (Remains as Stand-in)

TalkTV

In December 2020, Ofcom granted a licence to News UK & Ireland Limited, to operate a new television channel on satellite and cable. By April 2021, it was thought that News UK TV would become a streaming-only service which would operate for a few hours a night.

By September 2021, plans for a service called News UK TV had been scrapped, and talkRadioTV had been soft-launched as a streaming service on smart/internet-connected TVs, with Mike Graham, Trisha Goddard, Julia Hartley-Brewer, Jeremy Kyle and Robert Rinder featuring as presenters on the service. Later in September 2021, it was reported that the 'Talk' brand would be used for a digital terrestrial channel that would be available on FreeSat and Freeview, as well as on Sky UK and Virgin Media, in 2022. It was also reported that TalkTV had signed up Piers Morgan to be a presenter of a programme (which would also be shown on Fox Nation in the US and on Sky News Australia) and that the new service would also feature current affairs documentaries, programmes about sport, and entertainment features.

References

External links

News and talk radio stations in the United Kingdom
2016 establishments in the United Kingdom
News Corporation
Radio stations established in 2016
Wireless Group